United People's Party in Malaysia may refer to:
 United Sarawak Party (PSB), a Sarawak-based party rebranded from earlier formed United People's Party (UPP)
 Malaysian United People's Party (MUPP) or Parti Bersatu Rakyat Malaysia (BERSAMA), a nationwide party
 Sarawak United Peoples' Party (SUPP), one of the oldest Sarawak-based parties